Khame Mi was the first chief queen consort of King Swa Saw Ke of Ava. She is regarded as the mother of King Tarabya, the successor of Swa, by the standard Burmese chronicles despite inscriptional evidence to the contrary.

Brief
The chronicles provide little detail about her background. Given that her brother Thilawa was married to Saw Pale, a granddaughter of King Kyawswa of Pagan, and that she herself was married to Swa Saw Ke, brother of Saw Pale, she was certainly of royal descent. She had at least one other brother, Maha Pyauk. Furthermore, she most probably married Swa some time between 1343 and 1351 during his stint as governor of Yamethin in the Pinya Kingdom before his defection to Sagaing  1351.

In 1367, King Thado Minbya of Ava died, leaving no heirs. The court first offered the throne to Thilawa but her brother declined, instead recommending Swa for the job. Swa accepted the offer, and Khame Mi became the chief queen with the title of Queen of the Southern Palace. According to the standard chronicles Maha Yazawin  and Hmannan Yazawin, she finally bore Swa a child, who later became King Tarabya. However, the Yazawin Thit chronicle, citing a contemporary inscription, says Shin Saw Gyi was the mother of Tarabya but the compilers of Hmannan rejected it nonetheless. (Since Tarabya was born in December 1368, she would have been in her 30s, probably mid-to-late 30s.)

At any rate, the chief queen died some time between 1387 and 1398, and was succeeded by Shin Saw Gyi as the chief queen.

Notes

References

Bibliography
 
 

Chief queens consort of Ava
14th-century Burmese women